Nelli Kalikova (born 16 February 1949, Tallinn) is an Estonian politician. She was a member of X Riigikogu.

She has been a member of Res Publica Party.

References

Living people
1949 births
Res Publica Party politicians
Members of the Riigikogu, 2003–2007
Women members of the Riigikogu
Politicians from Tallinn
21st-century Estonian women politicians